Por Mi Orgullo (For My Pride) is a compilation album released by the Mexican recording artist Juan Gabriel on September 28, 1998. All tracks previously available

Track listing

References 

1998 compilation albums
Juan Gabriel compilation albums
RCA Records compilation albums
Spanish-language compilation albums